The Filth and the Fury is a 2000 British rockumentary film directed by Julien Temple. It follows the story of punk rock pioneers the Sex Pistols from their humble beginnings in London's Shepherd's Bush to their fall at the Winterland Ballroom in San Francisco. It is considered a continuation of Temple's first documentary centered on the band, titled The Great Rock and Roll Swindle, but acts as an opportunity for the surviving members of the group to tell their side of the story.

Description
The Filth and the Fury is the second movie Julien Temple made about The Sex Pistols. His first effort was The Great Rock and Roll Swindle, which was released in British cinemas on 15 May 1980. This earlier effort was heavily criticised for being too skewed towards the Pistols' manager Malcolm McLaren's version of events about the band. The Filth and the Fury tells the story from the viewpoint of the band members themselves (albeit in silhouette during their contemporary interviews).

The title of the film is a reference to a headline that appeared in the British tabloid newspaper The Daily Mirror on 2 December 1976 after an interview on ITV's Today presented by Bill Grundy. The title of The Daily Mirror article was itself inspired by William Faulkner's novel The Sound and the Fury which was in turn taken from a line in Shakespeare's Macbeth.

Temple's documentary narrates the rise, decline and fall of the Sex Pistols from their humble beginnings in London's Shepherd's Bush to their disintegration at the Winterland Ballroom in San Francisco. Temple puts the band into historical context with Britain's social situation in the 1970s through archival footage from the period.  This film was seen in some ways as an opportunity for the Pistols to tell their perspective of the story mostly through interviews with the surviving members of the group, footage shot during the era, and outtakes from The Great Rock and Roll Swindle.

Soundtrack
The soundtrack to the film was released in 2002. The two-disc set contains songs by the Sex Pistols as well as music from other artists that was used in the film.

Disc one
"God Save the Queen (Symphony)"
"Shang-a-Lang" – Bay City Rollers
"Pictures of Lily" – The Who
"Virginia Plain" – Roxy Music
"School's Out" – Alice Cooper
"Skinhead Moonstomp" – Symarip
"Glass of Champagne" – Sailor
"Through My Eyes" – The Creation
"The Jean Genie" – David Bowie
"I'm Eighteen" – Alice Cooper
"Submission"
"Don't Gimme No Lip Child"
"What'cha Gonna Do About It"
"Road Runner"
"Substitute"
"Seventeen"

Disc two
"Anarchy in the UK"
"Pretty Vacant"
"Did You No Wrong"
"Liar"
"EMI"
"No Feelings"
"I Wanna Be Me"
"Way Over (In Dub)" – Tapper Zukie
"Looking for a Kiss" – New York Dolls
"Holidays in the Sun"
"No Fun"

See also
 Sid and Nancy
 The Great Rock and Roll Swindle

External links

 
 The Sex Pistols on Film
 Video of Bill Grundy's interview with the Sex Pistols
 Sex Pistols fansite

2000 films
British documentary films
Documentary films about punk music and musicians
Film4 Productions films
Films directed by Julien Temple
Sex Pistols compilation albums
Sex Pistols video albums
2000 documentary films
Sex Pistols soundtracks
2000 compilation albums
2000 soundtrack albums
2000s film soundtrack albums
2000s English-language films
2000s British films